Artyom Sergeyevich Drobyshev (born 14 September 1980) is a former Russian professional football player.

Club career
He played two seasons in the Russian Football National League for FC Lokomotiv Chita.

References

External links
 

1980 births
People from Krasnokamensky District
Living people
Russian footballers
Association football defenders
FC Chita players
Sportspeople from Zabaykalsky Krai